Londonderry City was a parliamentary constituency in northern Ireland. It returned one Member of Parliament (MP) to the United Kingdom House of Commons, elected by the first past the post voting system.

Boundaries and boundary changes
This constituency was the parliamentary borough of Londonderry (or Derry) in County Londonderry.

It was an original constituency represented in the first UK Parliament when the Acts of Union 1800 took effect on 1 January 1801, inheriting the boundaries and franchise of the Londonderry City constituency of the abolished Irish House of Commons. In 1922 it was combined with North Londonderry and South Londonderry, to form the Londonderry county constituency.

Politics
After the extension of the franchise in 1885, the constituency was one of the most marginal seats in Ireland.

Sinn Féin won in 1918. The MP, Professor Eoin MacNeill, was also returned for National University of Ireland. As MacNeill did not take his seat in the United Kingdom House of Commons he could not choose which constituency he would represent and arrange a by-election in the other. He played an active role in the First Dáil and in the government it set up.

Members of Parliament

Elections
The elections in this constituency took place using the first past the post electoral system.

Elections in the 1830s

On petition, Ferguson's election was declared void, causing a by-election.

Elections in the 1840s

Elections in the 1850s

Elections in the 1860s
Ferguson's death caused a by-election.

Elections in the 1870s
Dowse was appointed Solicitor-General for Ireland, requiring a by-election.

Dowse resigned after being appointed Chief Baron of the Irish Exchequer, causing a by-election.

Elections in the 1880s

On petition, Lewis was unseated. McCarthy was named as MP on 25 October.

Elections in the 1890s

Knox resigns, triggering a by-election.

Elections in the 1900s

 Results are compared to the 1895 election, not the by-election.

Hamilton is appointed Treasurer of the Household, prompting a by-election in which he stood unopposed.

Elections in the 1910s

Hamilton becomes Duke of Abercorn, prompting a by-election.

Hogg's death prompts another by-election.

 Results are compared to the December 1910 election, not the later by-elections.
 In common with other Sinn Féin MPs, Eoin MacNeill abstained from Westminster and took his seat as a TD in the First Dáil. He was also elected for the National University.

Footnotes

Notes

References
The Parliaments of England by Henry Stooks Smith (1st edition published in three volumes 1844–50), 2nd edition edited (in one volume) by F.W.S. Craig (Political Reference Publications 1973)

Who's Who of British members of parliament: Volume I 1832–1885, edited by M. Stenton (The Harvester Press 1976)

See also
 List of UK Parliament Constituencies in Ireland and Northern Ireland
 List of MPs elected in the 1918 United Kingdom general election
 List of Dáil Éireann constituencies in Ireland (historic)

Londonderry City
Constituencies of the Parliament of the United Kingdom established in 1801
Constituencies of the Parliament of the United Kingdom disestablished in 1922
Politics of Derry (city)
Westminster constituencies in County Londonderry (historic)